Samsung Display (Hangul: 삼성디스플레이), formerly S-LCD Corporation (Hangul: 에스 엘시디, Japanese: エス・エルシーディー), is a South Korean manufacturer of OLED panels and formerly a manufacturer of amorphous TFT LCD panels, owned by Samsung Electronics.

The company was established in April 2004 in Chungcheongnam-do, South Korea as a joint venture between Samsung Electronics Co. Ltd (51% share) and Sony Corporation (now known as Sony Group Corporation)(49% share).

S-LCD, as of April 25, 2008, operated with a monthly production capacity of 100,000 seventh-generation amorphous silicon (a-Si) panels and 50,000 eighth-generation panels based on PVA technology, which are integrated into both Samsung Electronics and Sony LCD televisions. S-LCD originally had production facilities in both Japan and South Korea. Due to rising costs and an increasing demand from the Latin American market, S-LCD opened production facilities in Baja California, Mexico, where both Samsung and Bravia have large LCD production facilities.

On December 26, 2011, Samsung Electronics announced that it will acquire all of Sony's shares. On January 19, 2012, Sony sold to Samsung all of its shares of S-LCD for 1.07 trillion Korean won (72 billion Japanese yen) in cash.

SLCD, S-LCD or Super LCD is also generally used term for an evolution of TN based TFT-LCD technology (e.g. iPhone 3GS uses S-LCD from LG Display)

History
2003: Samsung Electronics sign agreement for the establishment of a joint venture for seventh-generation amorphous TFT LCD panel production.
2004: S-LCD Corporation established.
April 2005: S-LCD begins shipment of seventh-generation TFT LCD panels for LCD TVs.
August 2007: S-LCD begins shipment of eighth-generation TFT LCD panels for LCD TVs.
2008: Sony and Samsung announce that due to increased demand, a second eighth-generation production line will operate in the S-LCD factory in the second quarter of 2009. S-LCD may be headed by Samsung alone as Sony has announced a joint venture with Sharp Corporation, in order to compete effectively with Samsung, a task made difficult by their current collaboration.
December 2011: The company's partners announce that Samsung will acquire Sony's entire stake in the joint venture, making S-LCD Corporation a wholly owned subsidiary of Samsung Electronics.
July 1, 2012: S-LCD and Samsung Mobile Display merge to create Samsung Display.
April 2021: Samsung Display's LCD factory in Suzhou, China is sold to TCL Technology's China Star Optoelectronics Technology.
January 4, 2022: Sony announces its A95K television that uses Samsung Display's QD-OLED panels.
March 17, 2022: Samsung Electronics announces its S95B television that uses Samsung Display's QD-OLED panels.
June 2022: Samsung Display terminates its LCD business. Samsung Display sold its LCD patents to TCL Technology's China Star Optoelectronics Technology.

Company Agent
CEO Chang Won-Kie (장원기)
CFO Onodera Jun

Other LCD manufacturers
LG Display
Sharp
Japan Display

References

External links

Samsung subsidiaries
Former Sony subsidiaries
Electronics companies of South Korea